Live at Perkins' Palace is the third record of Banyan, founded by Stephen Perkins.  On this disc, Stephen decided to take the legion of musicians from Anytime At All and cut it down strictly to a quartet.  Once again dedicated to Marc Perkins.

Track listing
 "Mad as a Hornet" (Stephen Perkins, William Waldman) – 5:44
 "Oh My People" (Suliaman El-Hadi) – 5:09
 "Om Om Om" (Mike Watt) – 3:44
 "Only You Will Know" (Mike Watt) – 3:22
 "El Sexxo" (Stephen Perkins, William Waldman) – 6:15
 "Israelite" (Mike Watt) – 5:13
 "A Million Little Laughs" (Mike Watt) – 3:35
 "Uncle Mike" (Mike Watt) – 1:57
 "King of Long Beach" (Nels Cline) – 5:39
 "Rocks a Fallin'" (Stephen Perkins) – 2:01
 "For E in E Minor" (Mike Watt) – 6:28
 "Fun House" (The Stooges) – 8:37

Players
 Stephen Perkins – Drums & Percussion
 Mike Watt – Bass
 Nels Cline – Guitar
 Willie Waldman – Trumpet

External links
Official Stephen Perkins website

Banyan (band) albums
2004 albums
Sanctuary Records albums